The 1930 Open Championship was the 65th Open Championship, held 18–20 June at Royal Liverpool Golf Club in Hoylake, England. Bobby Jones won his third Open Championship title, two strokes ahead of runners-up Leo Diegel and Macdonald Smith, on his way to the single-season Grand Slam.

Qualifying took place on 16–17 June, Monday and Tuesday, with 18 holes at Royal Liverpool and 18 holes at Wallasey, and the top 100 and ties qualified. Archie Compston led the field with 141; the qualifying score was 158 (+14) and 112 players advanced. Prize money was increased sixty percent, from £250 to £400.

Jones arrived in Hoylake after winning the British Amateur championship in late May. He opened with 70 on Wednesday, in a tie for the lead with Henry Cotton and Smith.  Jones followed with a 72 on Thursday to take a one-stroke lead over Fred Robson after 36 holes. The top 60 and ties would make the cut and qualify for the final 36 holes; it was at 158 (+14) and 61 advanced.

Archie Compston's third round score of 68 on Friday morning gave him a one-shot lead over Jones heading to the final round, but he then collapsed with an 82 in the afternoon and finished in sixth. Jones also struggled on the round, but a brilliant bunker shot on the 16th to within inches of the hole helped him card a 75 and a clubhouse lead of 291 (+3). Diegel was tied with Jones after the 13th, but he dropped shots at 14 and 16 and finished two behind. Smith came to the 17th needing to play the final two holes in no worse than six shots to tie Jones, but he missed his putt for a three and tied Diegel for second place.

Jones became the first player since John Ball in 1890 to win both the British Amateur and British Open in the same year. Returning to the United States with the first two jewels of the Grand Slam, he completed the feat by winning the U.S. Open in July and the U.S. Amateur in late September at Merion. Jones then retired from competitive golf at age 28 and never played in the Open Championship again; through 2016, he remains the last amateur to win it.

Jones' win ended a stretch where American-born golfers won ten consecutive major championships. This is the third longest winning streak in majors for American-born golfers after streaks that ended in 1947 and 1977.

Four-time winner and two-time defending champion Walter Hagen did not enter. Arnaud Massy, the 1907 champion, played in his final Open at age 52 and missed the cut by a stroke.

Course

Past champions in the field

Made the cut 

Source:

Missed the cut 

Source:

Did not advance past qualifying rounds (Monday & Tuesday):
Arthur Havers (1923) 159, Harry Vardon (1896, 1898, 1899, 1903, 1911, 1914) 160,Sandy Herd (1902), 163, James Braid (1901, 1905, 1906, 1908, 1910), 173.

Did not enter:
Walter Hagen (1922, 1924, 1928, 1929), Jock Hutchison (1921).

Round summaries

First round
Wednesday, 18 June 1930

Source:

Second round
Thursday, 19 June 1930

Source:

Third round
Friday, 20 June 1930 (morning)

Source:

Final round
Friday, 20 June 1930 (afternoon)

Source:

Amateurs: Jones (+3), Moe (+15), L. Hartley (+23), Sutton (+29), Tolley (+29),Bentley (+30), Oppenheimer (+33), Souley (+34).

References

External links
Royal Liverpool 1930 (Official site)

The Open Championship
Golf tournaments in England
Sport in the Metropolitan Borough of Wirral
Open Championship
Open Championship
Open Championship